Callona flavofasciata is a species of beetle in the family Cerambycidae. It was described by Chemsak & Hovore in 2011.

References

Callona
Beetles described in 2011